Animals is a 2014 American romantic drama film directed by Collin Schiffli and starring David Dastmalchian and Kim Shaw. The film is produced by Mary Pat Bentel, David Dastmalchian, Collin Schiffli, and Chris Smith. The film follows a couple (David Dastmalchian, Kim Shaw), who are living in a broken car and scam strangers to support their heroin addiction. When their misadventures turn from bad to worse, the young lovers must decide if true love can prevail in the face of all else.

Plot 
Jude (David Dastmalchian) and Bobbie (Kim Shaw) are a young couple that exist somewhere between homelessness and fantasy. Both struggle with and enable each other's intravenous heroin dependency, spending most of their time trying to score drugs. Sleeping in their dilapidated car or seedy Chicago motel rooms, they survive by shoplifting and committing low-level scams to scrounge up enough cash to stay one step ahead of their debilitating addiction.

Throughout the film, the viewer gets some background about the two protagonists. Jude is a college-educated, middle-class young man completely consumed by his heroin dependency.  Bobbie is originally from Missouri where her mother and intermittent opioid-abusing stepfather (who is also a physician) both still reside.  As the couple’s plight becomes increasingly dire, they are ultimately forced to face the reality of their situation. Jude is involuntarily admitted into a mental hospital to detox, leaving Bobbie to fend for herself through withdrawal. Unable to see each other, she starts sleeping in the parking lot of the hospital that is treating Jude.  The hospital security guard, Albert (John Heard), quickly discovers Bobbie, and she befriends him.  Initially, Bobbie's plan is to wait for Jude to be released from the hospital so that they can be reunited.  However, Albert's earlier suggestion for Bobbie to call her mother for help eventually convinces her. She makes arrangements to go back home knowing she and Jude may be separated forever.

The film ends with Jude about to be discharged, and the hospital finally allows Bobbie visitation.  They embrace while Bobbie explains to Jude that her intention is to stay with her mother and stepfather in Missouri.  She tells Jude that her mother expressly stipulated she cannot take him with her.  Jude and Bobbie find themselves at a crossroads, and they decide to part ways hoping to stay clean.

Cast 

 David Dastmalchian as Jude
 Kim Shaw as Bobbie
 John Heard as Albert
 John Hoogenakker as Guy (Prospective John 1)
 Ilyssa Fradin as Brenda (Jude's Therapist/Case Manager)
 John Lister IV as Norman (Security Guard at Office Building)
 Paul Perroni as Undercover Cop 1
 Simeon Henderson as Undercover Cop 2

Reception

Critical response 
On review aggregator Rotten Tomatoes, the film holds an approval rating of 85% based on 26 reviews, and an average rating of 7.03. The website's critical consensus reads, "Animals drug-fueled storyline is undeniably grim, but its sensitive approach to its difficult themes -- and its talented cast -- make watching it well worth the discomfort." Metacritic, which uses a weighted average, assigned the film a score of 71 out of 100, based on 13 critics, indicating "Generally favorable reviews".

Joe Leydon of Variety wrote, "Dastmalchian and Shaw are thoroughly convincing both as vividly drawn, emotionally complex individuals, and as a couple inextricably bound by addiction and enabling. Among the well-cast supporting players, John Heard makes the most significant impact by making every second count in his brief role as a sympathetic security guard." Steve Dollar of The Wall Street Journal wrote, "Director Collin Schiffli keeps a tight focus on character, as the couple's plight becomes increasingly dire." Sheila O'Malley of RogerEbert.com wrote, "Such small moments (and there are many in the film) help make what is a typical story memorable and somewhat unique. It's not a particularly interesting relationship because drug addicts tend to be boring, but it is a pleasure to watch both of these actors work."

Accolades

References

External links 

 

2014 drama films
2014 films
Films about heroin addiction
2010s English-language films